Frogdenites is an extinct ammonite genus from the order Ammonitida that lived during the Middle Jurassic in what is now Europe, Canada, and Tibet. Frogdenites is included in the Otoitidae, a family which makes up part of the ammonitid superfamily, Stephanoceratoidea.

Frogdenites has an evolute globular shell with a deep umbilicus and covered by bifurcating ribs that cross the venter, the outer rim of the shell, without interruption.

References

 Arkell et al.,1957; Ammonitina in the Treatise on Invertebrate Paleontology, Part L, Ammonoidea; Geological Soc of America and Univ Kansas press.

Ammonites of Europe
Jurassic ammonites